Fialho is a Portuguese surname. Notable people with this surname include:

 Alan Fialho (born 1993), Brazilian football player
 André Fialho (born 1994), Portuguese mixed martial artist
 Barbara Fialho (born 1987), Brazilian model and singer
 Éder Fialho (born 1973), Brazilian long-distance runner
 José Eduardo Fialho Gouveia, Portuguese television presenter
 José Manuel Bastos Fialho Gouveia (1935–2004), Portuguese television and radio host
 José Valentim Fialho de Almeida (1857–1911), Portuguese writer, journalist and translator

Portuguese-language surnames